This is a list of estimated global populations of Proboscidean species, including their delineated subspecies. This list is generally comprehensive, but there is also uncertainty to some estimations.

See also
 
Lists of organisms by population
Lists of mammals by population

References

Mammals
Elephant
Proboscideans
Elephants